Charles Knapp is the name of:

 Charles Knapp (cricketer) (1845-1927), New Zealand cricketer
 Charles Knapp (scholar) (1868–1936), classical American scholar
 Charles Knapp (congressman) (1797–1880), member of the United States House of Representatives from New York
 Charles J. Knapp (1845–1916), his son, member of the United States House of Representatives from New York
 Charles Boynton Knapp (born 1946), president of the University of Georgia
 Charles L. Knapp (1847–1929), member of the United States House of Representatives from New York
 Charles Knapp (geographer) (1855-1921), French teacher and founder of the Neuchâtel geographical society.